Statistics of Czechoslovak First League in the 1930–31 season. Josef Silný was the league's top scorer with 18 goals.

Overview
It was contested by 8 teams, and Slavia Prague won the championship.

League standings

Results

Relegation play-off 

|}

Top goalscorers

References
Notes

Sources
Czechoslovakia - List of final tables (RSSSF)

Czechoslovak First League seasons
1930–31 in Czechoslovak football
Czech